Houboulang Mendes (born 4 May 1998) is a French professional footballer who plays for La Liga club UD Almería. Mainly a right back, he can also play as a central defender.

Personal life
Born in Courcouronnes, France, Mendes is of Senegalese and Bissau-Guinean descent.

Club career
Mendes joined Stade Lavallois' youth setup at the age of 15, after playing for Juvisy-sur-Orge AF and ES Viry-Châtillon. After playing for the reserve team, he made his first team debut on 19 May 2017, coming on as a late substitute for Malik Couturier in a 2–1 Ligue 2 home loss against Nîmes Olympique, as his side was already relegated.

A regular starter in the 2017–18 Championnat National, Mendes left Laval on 24 July 2018, and signed a four-year deal with FC Lorient in the second division. He was regularly used until February 2019, when he suffered a knee injury.

Mendes returned to action in October 2019, playing for the B-side before making three first team appearances as Lorient achieved promotion to Ligue 1. He made his debut in the category on 23 August 2020, starting in a 3–1 home win over RC Strasbourg Alsace.

On 6 July 2022, Mendes moved abroad for the first time in his career, signing a four-year contract with La Liga side UD Almería.

References

External links

Living people
1998 births
People from Évry, Essonne
Footballers from Essonne
Association football defenders
French footballers
French people of Bissau-Guinean descent
Ligue 1 players
Ligue 2 players
Championnat National players
Championnat National 2 players
Championnat National 3 players
Stade Lavallois players
FC Lorient players
UD Almería players
French expatriate footballers
French expatriate sportspeople in Spain
Expatriate footballers in Spain